The 1972 FIBA Intercontinental Cup of National Teams was a special edition tournament of the FIBA Intercontinental Cup, and the 6th edition of the tournament overall. It took place at Ginásio do Ibirapuera, São Paulo, Brazil.

Participants

League stage
Day 1, January 26 & 27, 1972

|}

Day 2, January 28, 1972

|}

Day 3, January 29, 1972

|}

Final standings

References

External links
 1972 Intercontinental Cup of national basketball teams

1972
1972 in Brazilian sport
International basketball competitions hosted by Brazil
1971–72 in South American basketball
1971–72 in American basketball
1971–72 in European basketball
FIBA competitions between national teams
Soviet Union national basketball team games
Poland national basketball team
Brazil national basketball team